The 2014–15 UMKC Kangaroos men's basketball team represented the University of Missouri–Kansas City during the 2014–15 NCAA Division I men's basketball season. The Kangaroos were led by second year head coach Kareem Richardson. They played their home games at the Municipal Auditorium and were members of the Western Athletic Conference. They finished the season 14–19, 8–6 in WAC play to finish in a tie for second place. They advanced to the semifinals of the WAC tournament where they lost to Seattle.

Previous season
The Kangaroos finished the season 10–20, 7–9 in WAC play to finish in a tie for fifth place. They lost in the quarterfinals of the WAC tournament to Idaho.

Roster

Schedule

|-
!colspan=9 style="background:#006699; color:#FFCC00;"| Exhibition

|-
!colspan=9 style="background:#006699; color:#FFCC00;"| Regular season

|-
!colspan=9 style="background:#006699; color:#FFCC00;"| WAC tournament

References

Kansas City Roos men's basketball seasons
UMKC
UMKC Kanga
UMKC Kanga